Vieno Johannes (V.J.) "Jussi" Sukselainen (12 October 1906 – 6 April 1995; surname until 1928 Saari), was twice Prime Minister of Finland and four times Speaker of the Parliament. He was President of the Nordic Council in 1972 and 1977. He also served as the fourth Director General of Kela, the Finnish social security agency, from 1954 until 1971.

Sukselainen was born in Paimio and died in Espoo. He was a member of the Centre Party.

Cabinets
 Sukselainen I Cabinet
 Sukselainen II Cabinet

References

External links

1906 births
1995 deaths
People from Paimio
People from Turku and Pori Province (Grand Duchy of Finland)
Centre Party (Finland) politicians
Prime Ministers of Finland
Ministers of Finance of Finland
Ministers of the Interior of Finland
Ministers for Foreign Affairs of Finland
Speakers of the Parliament of Finland
Members of the Parliament of Finland (1948–51)
Members of the Parliament of Finland (1951–54)
Members of the Parliament of Finland (1954–58)
Members of the Parliament of Finland (1958–62)
Members of the Parliament of Finland (1962–66)
Members of the Parliament of Finland (1966–70)
Members of the Parliament of Finland (1972–75)
Members of the Parliament of Finland (1975–79)